Diane J. McBain (May 18, 1941 – December 21, 2022) was an American actress who, as a Warner Brothers contract player, reached a brief peak of popularity during the early 1960s. She was best known for playing an adventurous socialite in the 1960–1962 television series Surfside 6 and as one of Elvis Presley's leading ladies in 1966's Spinout.

Biography

Modelling
A native of Cleveland, Ohio, McBain moved to the Hollywood area at an early age and began her show business career as an adolescent model in print and television advertisements.

During her senior year at Glendale High School, while appearing in a Los Angeles play, she was spotted by a Warner Bros talent scout and added to the studio's roster of contract performers.

Warner Bros
Starting with the September 13, 1955, premiere of the hour-long, three-shows-in-one Warner Brothers Presents, the studio's TV arm, Warner Brothers Television, provided ABC with nearly 20 shows, including seven Westerns and four detective series.

At the age of 17, she was immediately put to work, making her television acting debut in two episodes of Maverick, March 8 with Jack Kelly and November 22, 1959, with James Garner, as well as the October 16 episode of 77 Sunset Strip. Her first director, at the helm of the March 8 installment, "Passage to Fort Doom", was veteran actor Paul Henreid.

Having received a positive reaction to McBain's initial performances, the studio realized it had a potential star under contract. She was given a prominent ingenue role in her first feature, the $3.5 million Ice Palace (1960) alongside Richard Burton and Robert Ryan. The filmed-on-location Technicolor epic was released on January 2, 1960, to mixed reviews, but McBain's notices were generally favorable.

Television

Warner Bros continued to keep McBain busy during 1960 with numerous appearances on its TV shows. She returned to 77 Sunset Strip on February 26, then nine days later found herself in Alaska with a guest role in the March 6 installment of The Alaskans, starring Roger Moore.
Eight days later, she was in Bourbon Street Beat and the following day on Sugarfoot. Another episode of Bourbon Street Beat followed two weeks later on March 28, and still another 77 Sunset Strip on May 6. In eight more days, she was in an episode of Lawman, and three weeks thereafter, on June 6, a third episode of Bourbon Street Beat in as many months. On March 1 and 2, 1967, during the second season of the ABC series Batman, she played socialite Pinkie Pinkston, a friend of Batman's alias Bruce Wayne.

Warners gave McBain a regular role on Surfside 6 (1960–62), supporting Troy Donahue, Van Williams, and Lee Patterson. Surfside 6 ran for two seasons.

Films
McBain had a banner year in 1960. In addition to appearing in a top feature film and guest-starring in eight TV episodes, she was assigned two more theatrical features. The first offered her one of three ingenue roles in a major "A" film, Parrish (1961), supporting Troy Donahue; the others were Connie Stevens and Sharon Hugueny. The film was a hit and made over $4 million.

Warners then gave McBain the star part in her own "B"-film vehicle, Claudelle Inglish (1961) when she replaced the original choice for the lead, Anne Francis, in the title role. It was based on a novel by Erskine Caldwell.

Warners gave her another lead role in a feature, Black Gold (1962), but it was not a success. She returned to guest starring on shows like Hawaiian Eye.

Producer Hall Bartlett borrowed McBain for a role in The Caretakers (1963) with Polly Bergen and Joan Crawford.

When 77 Sunset Strip kicked off its sixth and final season in 1963 with a special five-part story called 'Five', McBain played opposite Efrem Zimbalist, Jr. as "Carla Stevens".

She then supported Debbie Reynolds in Mary, Mary (1963). Her last film for Warners was A Distant Trumpet (1964) with Donahue and Suzanne Pleshette, the final film of director Raoul Walsh. In a 1964 interview she said she had "mostly been cast as the spoilt rich girl".

Warners announced her for Sex and the Single Girl (1964) in the role of a secretary. She turned down the role and Warners elected not to renew her contract.

Post-Warners career
McBain guest starred on Arrest and Trial, Wendy and Me, Kraft Suspense Theatre, Bob Hope Presents the Chrysler Theatre, Burke's Law (a number of times), The Wild Wild West, The Man from UNCLE, and Vacation Playhouse.

She was announced for the films Spring Is for Crying and Halcyon Years but neither was made. She made Five from the Hawk in Spain.

"I was very stupid about money," McBain said later. "My mother had always made my clothes, and I was embarrassed about it. I became a 
shopaholic and spent a fortune on store-bought clothes. Tammy Bakker probably copied the way I did my shopping and eyelashes."

Work began to dry up. "We were going through a revolution in society with the civil-rights movement and the Vietnam War," she said. "Now, white Anglo-Saxon, pretty people were low on the totem pole. We were thought to be on the other side, conservatives who were the cause of the war and the civil-rights problem. Dustin Hoffman, yes. Troy Donahue, no. Nobody wanted beautiful people on the screen. They wanted people like them, average. I didn't get much work."

"Disappearance", reappearance, and Presley film
In August 1965 McBain's parents reported her as missing. It turned out she had checked herself into a hotel in San Diego under the name "Marilyn Miller" for "a change of faces, scenery and attitudes... I just wanted to be Miss Nobody from Nowhere." She said she had been despondent over a slackening income and not getting the type of roles she wanted.

She was Elvis Presley's leading lady in Spinout (1966) alongside Shelley Fabares and Deborah Walley, and later that year she guest-starred on Batman.

AIP
McBain made two films with Fabian Forte at American International Pictures, Thunder Alley (1967), directed by Richard Rush, and Maryjane (1968), directed by Maury Dexter. Dexter then put McBain in the lead of AIP's The Mini-Skirt Mob (1968), a hit at the box office.

McBain supported Gardner McKay in I Sailed to Tahiti with an All Girl Crew (1968) and went to Crown International Pictures for Five the Hard Way (1969) aka The Sidehackers. She toured Vietnam in 1968 with Tippi Hedren and Joey Bishop.

1970s and 1980s
During the 1970s, McBain slowed her career somewhat to care for her son Evan, though she continued to make guest appearances in a number of television series. "I never really cared about superstardom, I only cared about the roles that were available to those who were superstars," she later said. "I was motivated to continue on in the face of total failure because I had a child to rear on my own with little help from his father. Acting was the best way for me to make money and the best way for me to be a more present mom in my son's life. Full-time jobs brought in money but kept me away from the day-to-day life of my child."

McBain guest-starred on Love, American Style, Mannix, To Rome with Love, Land of the Giants, and Mod Squad.

She had roles in the features The Delta Factor (1970), The Wild Season (1971), Huyendo del halcón (1973), Wicked, Wicked (1973), and The Deathhead Virgin (1974), which she later called "the stupidest screenplay I ever had to work with."

McBain also guested on the TV series The Wide World of Mystery, Police Story, Barbary Coast, and Marcus Welby, M.D..

Towards the end of the 1970s and in the early 1980s McBain was in Donner Pass: The Road to Survival (1978), The Life and Times of Grizzly Adams, Hawaii Five-O, Charlie's Angels, Eight Is Enough, Days of Our Lives, Dallas, Matt Houston, Airwolf, The Red Fury, Crazy Like a Fox, and Knight Rider. She also worked steadily in regional theatre.

Attack
In 1982, McBain was beaten, robbed, and raped by two men in her garage in West Hollywood at 1:30 am on Christmas Day after she came home from a party. She began a second career as a rape victim counselor.

They never found the culprits. "The shock of what happened caused loss of memory, inability to concentrate, and I'm still startled out of proportion," she said in 1990.

1990s to 2001
McBain appeared in Jake and the Fatman, Puppet Master 5 (1994), Sabrina, the Teenage Witch, Dr. Quinn, Medicine Woman, Invisible Mom II, The Young and the Restless, The Broken Hearts Club: A Romantic Comedy (2000), Besotted (2001), and Strong Medicine.

She was in a TV movie Cab to Canada (1998) which she said "was enough to make me never want to act again".
 
In 1990 she was seeking financing for her screenplay The Spilling Moon about the first woman to trek along the Colorado River through the Grand Canyon.

Death
McBain died from liver cancer on the morning of December 21, 2022, at the Motion Picture Country Home in Los Angeles, California, where she had lived for a number of years. She was 81.

References

External links
 
 
 
 Memorial to Deborah Walley by McBain
 Profile, glamourgirlsofthesilverscreen.com
 Comic Book Central interview with Diane

1941 births
2022 deaths 
Deaths from liver cancer 
Deaths from cancer in California
Actresses from Cleveland
American television actresses
Warner Bros. contract players
American film actresses
Western (genre) television actors
21st-century American women
United Service Organizations entertainers
20th-century American actresses